This is a list of 234 species in Microvelia, a genus of smaller water striders in the family Veliidae.

Microvelia species

 Microvelia acantha (Padilla-Gil, 2013) i c g
 Microvelia addisi Poisson, 1949 i c g
 Microvelia adrienneae Poisson, 1942 i c g
 Microvelia albolineolata Torre-Bueno, 1927 i c g
 Microvelia albomaculata Distant, 1909 i c g
 Microvelia albonotata Champion, 1898 i c g
 Microvelia alisonae Andersen and Weir, 2003 i c g
 Microvelia americana (Uhler, 1884) i c g b
 Microvelia ancona Drake and Chapman, 1954 i c g
 Microvelia andringitrae Poisson, 1952 i c g
 Microvelia angelesi Andersen and Weir, 2003 i c g
 Microvelia angolensis Hoberlandt, 1951 i c g
 Microvelia ankavandrae Poisson, 1952 i c g
 Microvelia annandalei Distant, 1909 i c g
 Microvelia annemarieae Andersen and Weir, 2003 i c g
 Microvelia apunctata Andersen and Weir, 2003 i c g
 Microvelia arabica Brown, 1951 i c g
 Microvelia arca Drake, 1958 i c g
 Microvelia argentata Nieser and Alkins-Koo, 1991 i c g
 Microvelia argusta Drake and Maldonado-Capriles, 1954 i c g
 Microvelia arussii Poisson, 1955 i c g
 Microvelia aschnakiranae Makhan, 2014 i c g
 Microvelia ashlocki J. Polhemus, 1968 i c g
 Microvelia atrata Torre-Bueno, 1916 i c g
 Microvelia atroelegans Zettel and Gapud, 1999 i c g
 Microvelia atromaculata Paiva, 1919 i c g
 Microvelia australiensis Andersen and Weir, 2003 i c g
 Microvelia austrina Torre-Bueno, 1924 i c g
 Microvelia awasai Poisson, 1951 i c g
 Microvelia ayacuchana Drake and Maldonado-Capriles, 1952 i c g
 Microvelia ayos Linnavuori, 1977 i c g
 Microvelia barbifer Andersen and Weir, 2003 i c g
 Microvelia beameri McKinstry, 1937 i c g
 Microvelia bossangoa Linnavuori, 1977 i c g
 Microvelia bourbonensis Poisson, 1957 i c g
 Microvelia braziliensis McKinstry, 1937 i c g
 Microvelia briseis Kirkaldy, 1900 i c g
 Microvelia buenoi Drake, 1920 i c g b
 Microvelia bulckei Poisson, 1957 i c g
 Microvelia burmanica Paiva, 1918 i c g
 Microvelia californiensis McKinstry, 1937 i c g
 Microvelia cameron Andersen, Yang and Zettel, 2002 i c g
 Microvelia carinata Linnavuori, 1977 i c g
 Microvelia carnarvon Andersen and Weir, 2003 i c g
 Microvelia cassisi Andersen and Weir, 2003 i c g
 Microvelia cavernula J. Polhemus, 1972 i c g
 Microvelia cavicola J. Polhemus, 1999 i c g
 Microvelia cerifera McKinstry, 1937 i c g
 Microvelia chanita J. Polhemus and Hogue, 1972 i c g
 Microvelia childi Andersen, 1969 i c g
 Microvelia chilena Drake and Hussey, 1955 i c g
 Microvelia cinchonana Drake and Hussey, 1954 i c g
 Microvelia circumcincta Champion, 1898 i c g
 Microvelia costaiana Drake and Hussey, 1951 i c g
 Microvelia crassipes Lundblad, 1933 i c g
 Microvelia crinata Drake, 1951 i c g
 Microvelia cubana Drake, 1951 i c g
 Microvelia dalawa Zettel, 2014 i c g
 Microvelia depressa J. Polhemus, 1974 i c g
 Microvelia distanti Lundblad, 1933 i c g
 Microvelia distincta Malipatil, 1980 i c g
 Microvelia douglasi Scott, 1874 i c g
 Microvelia duidana Drake and Maldonado-Capriles, 1952 i c g
 Microvelia eborensis Andersen and Weir, 2003 i c g
 Microvelia electra Andersen, 2001 i c g
 Microvelia falcifer Andersen and Weir, 2003 i c g
 Microvelia fanera (Padilla-Gil, 2013) i c g
 Microvelia fasciculifera McKinstry, 1937 i c g
 Microvelia flavipes Champion, 1898 i c g
 Microvelia fluvialis Malipatil, 1980 i c g
 Microvelia fontinalis Torre-Bueno, 1916 i c g
 Microvelia fosoana Linnavuori, 1977 i c g
 Microvelia gapudi Zettel, 2012 i c g
 Microvelia genitalis Lundblad, 1933 i c g
 Microvelia gerhardi Hussey, 1924 i c g
 Microvelia gestroi Kirkaldy, 1901 i c g
 Microvelia glabrosulcata J. Polhemus, 1974 i c g
 Microvelia gracillima Reuter, 1883 i c g
 Microvelia grimaldii Andersen, 2001 i c g
 Microvelia hambletoni Drake, 1951 i c g
 Microvelia herberti Andersen and Weir, 2003 i c g
 Microvelia hidalgoi McKinstry, 1937 i c g
 Microvelia hinei Drake, 1920 i c g
 Microvelia horvathi Lundblad, 1933 i c g
 Microvelia hozari Hoberlandt, 1948 i c g
 Microvelia hungerfordi McKinstry, 1937 i c g
 Microvelia hynesi Poisson, 1949 i c g
 Microvelia hypipamee Andersen and Weir, 2003 i c g
 Microvelia inannana Drake and Hottes, 1952 i c g
 Microvelia inguapi Padilla-Gil and Moreira, 2013 i c g
 Microvelia inquilina J. Polhemus and Hogue, 1972 i c g
 Microvelia insignis (Distant, 1903) i c g
 Microvelia intonsa Drake, 1951 i c g
 Microvelia ioana Drake and Hottes, 1952 i c g
 Microvelia irrasa Drake and Harris, 1928 i c g
 Microvelia isa Zettel, 2012 i c g
 Microvelia isabelae Bachmann, 1979 i c g
 Microvelia itremoi Poisson, 1952 i c g
 Microvelia jaechi Zettel and Gapud, 1999 i c g
 Microvelia japonica Esaki and Miyamoto, 1955 i c g
 Microvelia javadiensis Thirumalai, 1989 i c g
 Microvelia justi Andersen and Weir, 2003 i c g
 Microvelia kakadu Andersen and Weir, 2003 i c g
 Microvelia kamassanguensis Hoberlandt, 1951 i c g
 Microvelia karunaratnei J. Polhemus, 1999 i c g
 Microvelia kijabiensis Poisson, 1941 i c g
 Microvelia kipopoella Linnavuori, 1973 i c g
 Microvelia kyushuensis Esaki and Miyamoto, 1955 i c g
 Microvelia laesslei Drake and Hussey, 1954 i c g
 Microvelia lakatomivolae Poisson, 1957 i c g
 Microvelia leavipleura J. Polhemus, 1974 i c g
 Microvelia legorskyi Zettel, 2012 i c g
 Microvelia leptotmema Nieser and Alkins-Koo, 1991 i c g
 Microvelia leucothea J. Polhemus and Manzano, 1992 i c g
 Microvelia leveillei (Lethierry, 1877) i c g
 Microvelia lilliput Andersen and Weir, 2003 i c g
 Microvelia limaiana Drake, 1951 i c g
 Microvelia lineatipes Paiva, 1919 i c g
 Microvelia lokobei Poisson, 1951 i c g
 Microvelia longicornis Torre-Bueno, 1925 i c g
 Microvelia longipes Uhler, 1894 i c g
 Microvelia loriae Kirkaldy, 1901 i c g
 Microvelia lujanana Drake, 1951 i c g
 Microvelia lundbladi Y. C. Gupta and Khandelwal, 2002 i c g
 Microvelia macani Brown, 1953 i c g
 Microvelia macgregori (Kirkaldy, 1899) i c g
 Microvelia magnifica Lundblad, 1933 i c g
 Microvelia malipatili Andersen and Weir, 2003 i c g
 Microvelia margaretae Andersen and Weir, 2003 i c g
 Microvelia marginata Uhler, 1893 i c g
 Microvelia maromandiae Poisson, 1951 i c g
 Microvelia mbanga Linnavuori, 1977 i c g
 Microvelia milleri Andersen and Weir, 2003 i c g
 Microvelia mimula White, 1879 i c g
 Microvelia minima Drake, 1952 i c g
 Microvelia minutissima Zettel and Tran, 2009 i c g
 Microvelia mitohoi Poisson, 1951 i c g
 Microvelia miyamoti Y. C. Gupta and Y. K. Gupta, 2008 i c g
 Microvelia mjobergi Hale, 1925 i c g
 Microvelia monteithi Andersen and Weir, 2003 i c g
 Microvelia morimotoi Miyamoto, 1964 i c g
 Microvelia mossman Andersen and Weir, 2003 i c g
 Microvelia munda Drake, 1951 i c g
 Microvelia myorensis Andersen and Weir, 2003 i c g
 Microvelia negusi Poisson, 1955 i c g
 Microvelia nelsoni Moreira, Barbosa and Ribeiro, 2012 i c g
 Microvelia nessimiani Moreira and Rúdio in Rúdio and Moreira, 2011 i c g
 Microvelia niangbo Linnavuori, 1977 i c g
 Microvelia noeli Poisson, 1951 i c g
 Microvelia novana Drake and Plaumann, 1955 i c g
 Microvelia oaxacana Drake, 1951 i c g
 Microvelia oceanica Distant, 1914 i c g
 Microvelia odontogaster Andersen and Weir, 2003 i c g
 Microvelia oraria Drake, 1952 i c g
 Microvelia pacifica Kirkaldy, 1908 i c g
 Microvelia paludicola Champion, 1898 i c g
 Microvelia panamensis Champion, 1898 i c g
 Microvelia parallela Blatchley, 1925 i c g
 Microvelia paramega Andersen and Weir, 2003 i c g
 Microvelia parana Drake and Carvalho, 1954 i c g
 Microvelia pauliani Poisson, 1951 i c g
 Microvelia paura J. Polhemus, 1974 i c g
 Microvelia pennicilla Andersen and Weir, 2003 i c g
 Microvelia peramoena Hale, 1925 i c g
 Microvelia pererai J. Polhemus, 1979 i c g
 Microvelia peruviensis McKinstry, 1937 i c g
 Microvelia petraea Andersen, Yang and Zettel, 2002 i c g
 Microvelia pexa Drake and Hussey, 1951 i c g
 Microvelia picinguaba Moreira and Barbosa, 2011 i c g
 Microvelia piedrancha Padilla-Gil and Moreira, 2013 i c g
 Microvelia plumbea Lundblad, 1933 i c g
 Microvelia polhemi Andersen, 2000 i c g
 Microvelia popovi Brown, 1951 i c g
 Microvelia portoricensis Drake, 1951 i c g
 Microvelia potama Drake, 1958 i c g
 Microvelia prompta Cheesman, 1926 i c g
 Microvelia pronotalis (Distant, 1913) i c g
 Microvelia pseudomarginata Nieser and Alkins-Koo, 1991 i c g
 Microvelia psilonota J. Polhemus, 1974 i c g
 Microvelia pudoris Drake and Harris, 1936 i c g
 Microvelia pueblana Drake and Hottes, 1952 i c g
 Microvelia pulchella Westwood, 1834 i c g b
 Microvelia pygmaea (Dufour, 1833) i c g
 Microvelia queenslandiae Andersen and Weir, 2003 i c g
 Microvelia quieta Drake and Carvalho, 1954 i c g
 Microvelia rasilis Drake, 1951 i c g
 Microvelia recifana Drake, 1951 i c g
 Microvelia reflexa J. Polhemus, 1974 i c g
 Microvelia rennellensis Brown, 1968 i c g
 Microvelia reticulata (Burmeister, 1835) i c g
 Microvelia rishwani Makhan, 2014 i c g
 Microvelia rouwenzoriana Poisson, 1941 i c g
 Microvelia royi Poisson, 1954 i c g
 Microvelia rufescens Champion, 1898 i c g
 Microvelia sambiranoi Poisson, 1951 i c g
 Microvelia santala Hafiz and Ribeiro, 1939 i c g
 Microvelia sarpta Drake and Harris, 1936 i c g
 Microvelia schmidti McKinstry, 1937 i c g
 Microvelia setipes Champion, 1898 i c g
 Microvelia seyferti Zettel, 2014 i c g
 Microvelia signata Uhler, 1894 i c g
 Microvelia silvestris Hoberlandt, 1951 i c g
 Microvelia somnokrene Zettel and Gapud, 1999 i c g
 Microvelia spurgeon Andersen and Weir, 2003 i c g
 Microvelia starmuehlneri J. Polhemus and Herring, 1970 i c g
 Microvelia stellata Kirkaldy, 1902 i c g
 Microvelia summersi Drake and Harris, 1928 i c g
 Microvelia takiyae Moreira, Barbosa and Ribeiro, 2012 i c g
 Microvelia tasmaniensis Andersen and Weir, 2003 i c g
 Microvelia tateiana Drake, 1951 i c g
 Microvelia timida Drake and Roze, 1958 i c g
 Microvelia torquata Champion, 1898 i c g
 Microvelia torresiana Andersen and Weir, 2003 i c g
 Microvelia trichota Nieser and Chen, 2005 i c g
 Microvelia trinitatis China, 1943 i c g
 Microvelia tsaratananae Poisson, 1952 i c g
 Microvelia tshingandana Linnavuori and Weber, 1974 i c g
 Microvelia tuberculata Andersen and Weir, 2003 i c g
 Microvelia ubatuba Moreira and Barbosa, 2011 i c g
 Microvelia uenoi Miyamoto, 1964 i c g
 Microvelia undata Poisson, 1964 i c g
 Microvelia urucara Moreira, Barbosa and Nessimian, 2011 i c g
 Microvelia urundii Poisson, 1955 i c g
 Microvelia vagans White, 1878 i c g
 Microvelia ventrospinosa Andersen and Weir, 2003 i c g
 Microvelia venustatis Drake and Harris, 1933 i c g
 Microvelia venustissima Poisson, 1941 i c g
 Microvelia verana Drake and Hottes, 1952 i c g
 Microvelia vilhenai Hoberlandt, 1951 i c g
 Microvelia villosula Torre-Bueno, 1927 i c g
 Microvelia waelbroecki Kirkaldy, 1900 i c g
 Microvelia wala Zettel, 2012 i c g
 Microvelia woodwardi Andersen and Weir, 2003 i c g
 Microvelia zillana Drake and Hottes, 1952 i c g

Data sources: i = ITIS, c = Catalogue of Life, g = GBIF, b = Bugguide.net

References

Microvelia